{{DISPLAYTITLE:Pi1 Orionis}}

Pi1 Orionis (π1 Ori, π1 Orionis) is a star in the equatorial constellation of Orion. It is faintly visible to the naked eye with an apparent visual magnitude of 4.74. Based upon an annual parallax shift of 28.04 mas, it is located about 116 light-years from the Sun.

This is an A-type main-sequence star with a stellar classification of A3 Va. It is a Lambda Boötis star, which means the spectrum shows lower-than-expected abundances for heavier elements. Pi1 Orionis is a relatively young star, just 100 million years old, and is spinning fairly rapidly with a projected rotational velocity of 120 km/s. It has nearly double the mass of the Sun and 167% of the Sun's radius.

An infrared excess indicates there is a debris disk with a temperature of 80 K orbiting  from the star. The dust has a combined mass 2.2% that of the Earth.

References

A-type main-sequence stars
Orion (constellation)
Orionis, Pi1
Orionis, 07
031295
022845
01570
Durchmusterung objects